Curtis Lanneal Hollingsworth (December 18, 1916 – May 30, 1988) was an American Negro league pitcher in the 1940s.

A native of Jackson, Mississippi, Hollingsworth played for the Birmingham Black Barons in 1946 and 1947. He died in Birmingham, Alabama in 1988 at age 71.

References

External links
 and Seamheads

1916 births
1988 deaths
Birmingham Black Barons players